LaRoi Johnson (born January 7, 1985) is an indoor football tight end who is currently a free agent. Johnson played collegiate ball at Malone University where he was named All-Mid-States Football Association First Team in 2007.

Early life
Johnson attended Peabody High School in Pittsburgh, Pennsylvania, where he was a member of the football team.

College career
Johnson committed to play at California University of Pennsylvania after high school. He played at California for 2 seasons, before transferring to Malone University. As a senior in 2007, Johnson was named 1st Team All-Mid-States Football Association as a tight end.

Statistics
Sources:

Professional career

Pre-draft
Prior to the 2008 NFL Draft, Johnson was projected to be undrafted by NFLDraftScout.com. He was rated as the 47th-best tight end in the draft.

Indoor/Arena career
He has played, or signed with the Tulsa Talons, Kentucky Horsemen, Marion Mayhem, Canton Legends, Rock River Raptors, San Angelo Stampede Express, Utah Blaze, Huntington Hammer, Harrisburg Stampede, Erie Explosion, Abilene Bombers, Cape Fear Heroes, Marion Blue Racers,

In 2011, LaRoi Johnson Posted 45 receptions for 450 yards and 9 touchdowns.

In October 2012, Johnson signed with the Abilene Bombers in the Lone Star Football League (LSFL).

In March 2014, Johnson signed with the Cape Fear Heroes in the American Indoor Football League ( AIF). https://web.archive.org/web/20140614115655/http://aifprofootball.com/transaction-logs.html

In 2014, Johnson signed with the Erie Explosion for the 2015 season.

In 2015 Johnson retired from playing Arena/Indoor football.

References

1985 births
Living people
California Vulcans football players
San Angelo Stampede Express players
Marion Mayhem players
Canton Legends players
Rock River Raptors players
Albany Firebirds (af2) players
Fort Wayne FireHawks players
Erie Explosion players
Marion Blue Racers players
Harrisburg Stampede players
Huntington Hammer players
Abilene Ruff Riders players
Cape Fear Heroes players